Carmenta texana, the Texana clearwing moth, is a moth of the family Sesiidae. It was described by Henry Edwards in 1881 and is known from the US states of Texas and Florida.

The wingspan is about 22 mm.

References

External links
"640161.00 – 2614 – Carmenta texana – Texana Clearwing Moth – (Edwards, 1881)". Moth Photographers Group. Mississippi State University.

Sesiidae
Moths described in 1881